Kenneth Giles Friedkin (September 1, 1915 – March 16, 1962) was an American aviator and businessman.

Biography
He was born in New York City during World War I, the son of a Russian-born tailor and American mother. He and his parents moved to Kansas, and later San Diego, California.

Friedkin became interested in aviation after he saw an air show in San Diego at the age of 8. Friedkin obtained his pilot license at the age of 17. In 1945, he opened a flight school called the Plosser-Friedkin School (later named the Friedkin School of Aeronautics). The parent company to the school was Friedkin Aeronautics Inc. The school was not making enough profit. He tried numerous business methods from aerial fish delivery to banner towing with the help of his comrades J. Floyd Andrews and Bill Shimp. Friedkin tried a charter airline called Friedkin Airlines. Friedkin Airlines was a failure.

Using the lessons learned from Friedkin Airlines and receiving advice from a travel agent, he and his wife Jean Friedkin created an airline called Pacific Southwest Airlines in 1949. The airline was a success, and gave Friedkin Aeronautics Inc. profit. Friedkin died at the age of 47 in 1962 of a cerebral hemorrhage. His wife, Jean, died the following year. After he died, J. Floyd Andrews became the president of PSA. His only child, Thomas Friedkin, lived to see PSA purchased by USAir.

In 2015, Friedkin was inducted into the International Air & Space Hall of Fame at the San Diego Air & Space Museum.

Friedkin's companies
Friedkin Aeronautics Inc. (later Pacific Southwest Airlines Inc.) - Parent company for most of Friedkin's businesses
Plosser-Friedkin School (Friedkin School of Aeronautics)
Friedkin Airlines
Pacific Southwest Airlines
Giles Inc. - Aviation leasing company

References

External links
Pacific Southwest Airlines By Alan Renga, Mark E. Mentges

1915 births
1962 deaths
American people of Russian-Jewish descent
Businesspeople in aviation
20th-century American businesspeople
Airline founders
Businesspeople from New York City
Aviators from New York (state)
Businesspeople from San Diego
Aviators from California